Florilegium, the journal of the Canadian Society of Medievalists / Société canadienne des médiévistes, is a quarterly "international, peer-reviewed academic journal concerned with the study of late Antiquity and the Middle Ages".

Originally titled Florilegium: Carleton University Annual Papers on Classical Antiquity and the Middle Ages, the journal was first published in 1979 under the co-editorship of Roger Blockley and Douglas Wurtele, and adopted as the Canadian Society of Medievalists’s official journal in 1997.

Currently published by the University of Toronto Press on behalf of the Canadian Society, the journal accepts previously unpublished, "original scholarly research in all areas of late antique and medieval studies and especially welcomes papers […] which take a cross-cultural or interdisciplinary approach to history, literature, or any other relevant area of study". Submissions, which may be in English or French, are subjected to double-blind peer-review.

Abstracting and indexing
The journal is abstracted and indexed in:
 Annual Bibliography of English Language and Literature
 Base d’information bibliographique en Patristique/Bibliographic Information Base in Patristics
 Chaucer Bibliography Online
 EBSCO Electronic Journals Service
 Encomia
 Feminae: Medieval Women and Gender Index
 Google Scholar
 Humanities Source Ultimate
 International Medieval Bibliography
 ITER: Gateway to the Middle Ages and Renaissance
 MLA Directory of Periodicals
 Regesta Imperii
 Studies in the Age of Chaucer
 Ulrich’s Periodicals Directory

References

External links

University of Toronto Press academic journals
Annual journals
Publications established in 1979